Yulduz Kuchkarova (born January 25, 1994) is an Uzbekistani swimmer. At the 2012 Summer Olympics, she competed in the Women's 200 metre backstroke, finishing in 37th place overall in the heats, failing to qualify for the semifinals.

References

Uzbekistani female backstroke swimmers
Living people
Olympic swimmers of Uzbekistan
Swimmers at the 2012 Summer Olympics
Swimmers at the 2010 Summer Youth Olympics
Swimmers at the 2006 Asian Games
Swimmers at the 2010 Asian Games
Swimmers at the 2014 Asian Games
Swimmers at the 2018 Asian Games
Asian Games competitors for Uzbekistan
Kansas Jayhawks athletes
1994 births
21st-century Uzbekistani women